Bare root is a technique of arboriculture whereby a plant is removed from soil in a dormant state, from which it can more rapidly acclimate to new soil conditions.

Bare root stock should be planted within 48 hours of receipt for optimal results.

Examples
Bare rooting is often used as a method of propagating rose canes.

See also
Fruit tree propagation
Plant propagation
Division (horticulture)

References

Horticulture